The Barony of Gallen is one of the nine baronies in County Mayo, Ireland.  It is situated in the eastern part of the county south of the town of Ballina, bordering County Sligo. It incorporates the area between Foxford (north and west), Ballyvary (southwest), Swinford (south) and Bonniconlon (east).

The descendants of Cormac Gaileng, great grandson of Olioll Olum were called Gailenga, the race of Gaileng, and they gave their name to the barony of Gallen in Mayo.

Viscount Dillon of Costello-Gallen, created in 1622 for Theobald Dillon, Lord President of Connaught, held the title in the Peerage of Ireland.

See also

 Gailenga

Parishes in the Barony of Gallen

Toomore
Bohola
Attymass & Kilgarvan
Kildacommoge
Kilconduff Swinford
Killedan Kiltimagh
Meelick 
Tempelmore *Strade
Killasser
Midfield

Towns in the Barony of Gallen
Foxford
Ballyvary
Bonniconlon
Swinford
Kiltimagh

References

Baronies of County Mayo